Jan Christian Vestre (born 9 October 1986) is a Norwegian businessperson in the furniture industry, and politician for the Labour Party. He has  served as Minister of Trade and Industry since 2021.

Personal life and education
Vestre was born in Haugesund on 9 October 1986. He graduated in jurisprudence from the University of Oslo in 2017.

During summer of 2022, he entered a relationship with architect Viktoria Millentrup.

Business career
Vestre worked as a designer and manager in his family's furniture company, Vestre AS, and won an Entrepreneur of The Year award in 2019.

He took over the leadership of his family’s furniture company at the age of 26, following the death of his father.

Political career
During his youth, Vestre was a member of the Workers' Youth League, and was present at the summer camp on Utøya when Anders Behring Breivik attacked it. He escaped barefoot and ran along the shore, despite bleeding, he never noticed his injuries, and held out for an hour before being rescued.

Vestre served as a political advisor to then Minister of Trade and Industry Trond Giske, from June to October 2013.

Minister of Trade and Industry
He was appointed Minister of Trade and Industry in Støre's Cabinet on 14 October 2021.

Vestre and Minister of Climate and the Environment Espen Barth Eide announced that the government would work actively to cut emissions, with Vestre noting: "I believe that the richest country in the world must be willing to take some greater risks. The shift we are going through now is the biggest change in recent Norwegian history. The problem here in Norway is not that we have taken too much risk. We have rather been too cowardly to point out a direction and do what works. We no longer have time for that".

Vestre expressed that it is important for Norway to be coordinated with the rest of Europe when it came to decisions about either having standard time permanently or both standard and summer time.

In December, he and fellow ministers Marte Mjøs Persen and Anniken Huitfeldt, and Crown Prince Haakon visited the United States to promote Norwegian interests notably regarding "War, the Arctic, offshore wind, contemporary art and Christmas trees". However, like Persen, he returned to Norway earlier then planned.

On 14 December, Vestre attended a press conference alongside Trygve Slagsvold Vedum, Hadia Tajik and Anette Trettebergstuen to present the government's economic COVID-19 measures. In regards to his field of responsibility, Vestre announced that the national compensation scheme for businesses would be extended. Vestre stated: "We expect owners and managers to act responsibly. The government is clear that the COVID-19 support will go to keep people in work, not for the benefit of the owners".

On 28 December, Vestre expressed that there was no guarantee that measures would be lifted come January 2022. He emphasised with the restaurant service industry, and added that the government saw no other options. He did however state that if the number of cases went down, the government would possibly instigate the process of reopening.

After 100 days in office, Vestre stated that some things he hoped to get done going forwards, would be to possibly buy the state in and up in multiple companies, strengthen climate demands and put a break on executive salaries.

In late March, Vestre affirmed that Norway would follow the same line as the European Union when it came to adjusting the clock with summertime.

In May, he warned large companies to lower their leadership salaries, noting that they shouldn’t earn more than regular people. Vestre also expressed that harsh measures could be taken, notably to deny any further bonus salaries or exclude board members who wouldn’t follow through with the changes. He stated: "The boards must know their visiting hours. The boards are responsible for executive salaries and must listen to the expectations of a large and important owner such as the Norwegian people. If our requests are not sufficient, we may either change the regulations or put other people on the boards".

On 25 May, it was revealed that Vestre had given financial support to Extinction Rebellion of 300,000kr back in 2021 when he was chief of his family company. The report from then also revealed that the financial support would be for a three year engagement. Vestre received criticism from opposition parties, such as the Conservatives and the Progress Party. Vestre later asserted that he no longer supports Extinction Rebellion in response to activists gluing themselves in the Storting audience gallery in protest. In a statement he said: "I am also passionate about the climate issue, but paralyzing the country's National Assembly is certainly not the right way to proceed". 

Vestre AS originally argued that the engagement had been severed due to Extinction Rebellion due their actions at several Swedish airports. However in early June, Dagbladet discovered an email from the company's strategy and sustainability manager, that it was because Vestre had been appointed minister in the new government. Vestre himself refused to comment on the revelation, with the Ministry of Trade and Fisheries noting that he had cut ties with the company.

On 28 June, Vestre announced that the Norwegian government would not repurchase equity in the ownership of SAS, notably citing that it had been irrelevant "since day one". He did however note that the Norwegian state would prefer to be a constructive creditor and limit losses as much as possible.

On 5 August, he expressed that a last resort to balance gender equality in company boards might have to be resolved with quotas for private companies. He also expressed disappointment in the equality balance, saying "we are in 2022, not 1922". He also stated that there are qualified female candidates to sit on a company board, but many of them doesn't have the chance to reach higher in ranks.

On 16 September, Vestre and the leaders of the Confederation of Norwegian Enterprise and the Norwegian Confederation of Trade Unions presented a negotiated electricity package that could assist over 20,000 companies. Despite this, the support scheme is due to expire by the end of the year (2022).

On 21 October, Vestre presented the government's first ownership message. The message included several, including changes to state owned company CEO's salaries, which included that they shouldn't get more then the average salary then the staff in kroner and pennies.

In December, Vestre announced that he would be calling for a meeting with the grocery store companies over new year to discuss the high prices on grocery items. He also added that the government is working with proposals to improve the competition and give lower grocery prices in the long run.

In January 2023, he and agriculture minister Sandra Borch met with the grocery store companies to discuss the rising food prices. He also announced a new measure aimed towards the grocery store companies, being a margin study to "see where the margins in this value chain end up".

References

1986 births
Living people
University of Oslo alumni
Norwegian businesspeople
Labour Party (Norway) politicians
Government ministers of Norway
Ministers of Trade and Shipping of Norway